Yateri-ye Bala (also Romanized as Yāterī-ye Bālā and Yātrī Bālā; also known as Yātarīābād-e ‘Olyā) is a village in Yateri Rural District, in the Central District of Aradan County, Semnan Province, Iran. At the 2006 census, its population was 708, in 208 families.

References 

Populated places in Aradan County